Cuenca may refer to:

People
 Cuenca (surname)

Places

Ecuador
 Cuenca Canton, in the Azuay Province
 Cuenca, Ecuador, capital of Cuenca Canton and Azuay Province 
 Roman Catholic Archdiocese of Cuenca

Peru
 Cuenca District, Huarochirí
 Cuenca District, Huancavelica

Philippines
 Cuenca, Batangas

Spain
 Province of Cuenca, a province in Spain
 Cuenca, Spain, capital of the province above
 Cuenca Railway Station
 Cuenca (Spanish Congress electoral district)
 Roman Catholic Diocese of Cuenca
 Cuenca de Campos, Valladolid
 Cuenca de Pamplona, Navarre
 Cuencas Mineras, Aragon
 Cuenca Minera (Huelva), Andalusia

United States
 Cuenca, Spanish name for Joara, a historical Native American settlement in modern-day North Carolina

Other uses
 C.D. Cuenca, a football team in Cuenca, Ecuador
 University of Cuenca, a university in Cuenca, Ecuador
 Cuenca Province (Gran Colombia), a defunct province of a defunct country

See also